Ultimo tango a Zagarol (internationally released as The Last Italian Tango and Last Tango in Zagarol) is a 1973 Italian comedy film directed by Nando Cicero. It is a parody of Last Tango in Paris, set in the town of Zagarolo, in the province of Rome.

The film had great commercial success, grossing about 950 million lire.

According to the film critic Robert Firsching, "the humor is primarily of the cheap bathroom variety, as subtlety has never been director Nando Cicero's strong point, but there are some genuine laughs for the tolerant".

Plot  
Franco has a controlling wife who forces her carnal needs on him. She also has a lover who hides in the attic, with whom she liaises when Franco falls asleep. Franco, angered on discovering this situation, meets a beautiful girl who's into erotic games. When his wife discovers her husband's affair with the mysterious girl, the trouble begins...

Cast 
Franco Franchi: Franco
Martine Beswick: The girl
Gina Rovere: Margherita
Franca Valeri: Director
Nicola Arigliano: Marcello
Ugo Fangareggi:  Operatore 
Nerina Montagnani: Addetta alla toilette

References

External links

Ultimo tango a Zagarol at Variety Distribution

1973 films
Films directed by Nando Cicero
Italian comedy films
Films shot in Rome
Italian parody films
Adultery in films
1973 comedy films
1970s Italian films